The Beastmaster is a 1982 sword and sorcery film directed by Don Coscarelli and starring Marc Singer, Tanya Roberts, John Amos and Rip Torn. Loosely based on the 1959 novel The Beast Master by Andre Norton, the film is about a man who can communicate with animals, and who fights an evil wizard and his army.

Commercially, The Beastmaster was not considered a box office success during its original cinematic run, but later received extensive television exposure and success on cable in the American market on channels TBS, TNT, and HBO. The original film spawned two sequels as well as a syndicated television series that chronicled the further adventures of Dar.

Plot
In the kingdom of Aruk, witches tell high priest Maax [ ] a prophecy that he will die at the hands of King Zed's unborn son. Maax sends one of his witches to kidnap and kill the child, but before she can, a villager rescues the child and raises him as his own son in the village of Emur. Named Dar, the child learns how to fight and develops his ability to telepathically communicate with animals. Years later, a fully grown Dar witnesses his people being slaughtered by the Juns, a horde of fanatic barbarians allied with Maax. Dar, the only survivor of the attack, journeys to Aruk to avenge his people. In time, Dar is joined by a golden eagle he names Sharak, a pair of thieving ferrets he names Kodo and Podo, and a black tiger he names Ruh.

Dar meets a slave girl called Kiri before getting himself lost and ending up surrounded by an eerie half-bird, half-human race who externally dissolve their prey for nourishment. As the bird-men worship eagles, they spare Dar when he summons Sharak and give him an amulet. Dar soon arrives at Aruk where Maax had assumed total control with the Juns' support. Maax has taken the children of the townspeople and is sacrificing them to his god, Ar. After having Sharak save the child of a townsman named Sacco, Dar learns that Kiri is to be sacrificed. On his way to save her, Dar is joined by Zed's younger son Tal and his bodyguard Seth, and learns that Kiri is Zed's niece as the three work to save her. While Seth gathers their forces, Dar helps Kiri and Tal infiltrate the temple and rescue King Zed.

An obstinate Zed leads his forces to attack the city, despite the prudent warnings of Dar, who leaves the group in anger. They all are easily defeated and captured, and Dar decides to return to save them from being sacrificed. In the conflict that follows, Maax reveals Dar's relationship to Zed before slitting Zed's throat and facing the Beastmaster. Despite being stabbed, Maax is revived by a witch and, when he attempts to kill Dar, Kodo sacrifices himself to cause the high priest to fall into the sacrificial flames. The victory is short-lived as the Jun horde approaches Aruk, arriving by nightfall to face the trap Dar and the people set for them. Tal is wounded as Dar succeeds in burning most of the Juns alive while defeating their chieftain before the bird-men arrive to consume those remaining. The following day, Seth invites Dar to be the new king, but Dar explains that Tal would make a better king, and he leaves Aruk. Dar sets off into the wild with Kiri, Ruh, Sharak and Podo, who has given birth to two baby ferrets.

Cast
 Marc Singer as Dar
 Billy Jacoby as young Dar
 Tanya Roberts as Kiri
 Rip Torn as Maax
 John Amos as Seth
 Josh Milrad as Tal
 Rod Loomis as King Zed
 Vanna Bonta as Zed's Wife 
 Ben Hammer as Dar's father
 Ralph Strait as Sacco
 Tony Epper as Jun Leader
 Paul Reynolds as Tils
 Donald Battee as Chameleon

Production
Beastmaster began with a screenplay in the early 1980s written by Paul Pepperman and Don Coscarelli. The two writers based their film on Andre Norton's 1959 novel The Beast Master. The writers changed the story dramatically as the original novel had the hero named Hosteen Storm who was a veteran soldier of Navajo descent in a futuristic science fiction setting. Norton was unhappy with the liberties taken with the film's script and asked for her name to be removed from the credits. When Coscarelli signed on as a director, Pepperman became the film's producer and brought in co-producer Sylvio Tabet to the project. The producers went to raise funds for the film at the 1981 MIFED film market in Milan and at the 1982 Cannes Film Festival. The budget of $9 million was raised, giving director Coscarelli his highest budget to work with up until that point in his career.

Coscarelli was frustrated while making the film, during which he feuded with the film's executive producer predominantly over the film's editing and casting. Coscarelli originally wanted Demi Moore for the role of Kiri, but the executive producer overrode his choice and had Tanya Roberts cast. The role of Maax was originally written for Klaus Kinski, but he was not cast over a salary dispute. The film was shot over the course of five-and-a-half months. The film was shot in California's Simi Valley and in Los Padres National Forest's Lake Piru in Ventura County, and Valley of Fire State Park in Nevada. Interior shots were done at MGM/UA lot.

The black panther was actually played by a tiger which they dyed black since tigers are easier to handle for filming. During production the tiger wasn't allowed to be on set at the same time as children or other animals, since it might harm them.

Music
The score was composed and conducted by Lee Holdridge; it was recorded in Rome with members of The Orchestra of the Academy of Santa Cecilia of Rome and the Radio Symphony Orchestra of Rome. The soundtrack album was originally issued by Varèse Sarabande, and subsequently by C.A.M. In 2013 Quartet Records released a 1200-copy limited edition featuring the original album (tracks 1–13, disc 1) and most of the film's score (Holdridge wrote eighty minutes of music for the film; a few cues could not be found, but the album includes music that was not heard in the finished product).

Disc 1
 The Legend of Dar (Main Theme) (1:32) 
 The Horde (The Destruction of Emur) (2:43) 
 A Sword and an Eagle (The Epic Begins) (4:49) 
 Friends of Dar (Suite 1): A) The Princess Kiri B) Kodo, Podo and Reu (3:35) 
 The Pyramid (2:47) 
 Night Journey (Suite 2) A) The Eagle B) The City (3:56) 
 The Battle on the Pyramid (6:42) 
 A Hero's Theme (The Legend of Dar) (2:56) 
 Heroic Friends (4:30) 
 Escape From the Pyramid (2:40) 
 Dar's Solitude (1:28) 
 The Great Battle (Dar's Triumph) (3:37) 
 The New Kingdom (3:22) 
 The Beastmaster (Seq. 1 – Main Titles) (1:48) 
 The Beastmaster (Seq. 2 – Stealing the Child) (3:12) 
 The Beastmaster (Seq. 3 – The Ritual) (1:36) 
 The Beastmaster (Seq. 4 – A New Father) (1:35) 
 The Beastmaster (Seq. 5 – Jun Raid) (4:21) 
 The Beastmaster (Seq. 6 – Sword and Eagle) (4:41) 
 The Beastmaster (Seq. 7 – Ferret Chase/Quicksand) (2:13) 
 The Beastmaster (Seq. 8 – Captive Panther/Fighting Juns) (2:53) 
 The Beastmaster (Seq. 9 – The Bathing Scene) (1:20) 
 The Beastmaster (Seq. 10 – Dar Pursues Kiri) (5:10)

Disc 2
 The Beastmaster (Seq. 11 – Journey to the City) (1:31) 
 The Beastmaster (Seq. 12 – Sacrifice Thwarted) (4:16) 
 The Beastmaster (Seq. 13 – Death Sentence) (2:16) 
 The Beastmaster (Seq. 14 – Eagle Vision) (2:22) 
 The Beastmaster (Seq. 15 – The Rescue of Kiri) (2:21) 
 The Beastmaster (Seq. 16 – Raft Escape) (4:12) 
 The Beastmaster (Seq. 17 – Into the Pyramid/Corridor Ambush) (1:00) 
 The Beastmaster (Seq. 18 – Stealing the Keys/The Cell) (4:41) 
 The Beastmaster (Seq. 19 – The Escape Begins/The Escape Continues) (2:49) 
 The Beastmaster (Seq. 20 – A Little Late) (1:27) 
 The Beastmaster (Seq. 21 – Outside the Pyramid) (1:34) 
 The Beastmaster (Seq. 22 – Through the Gate/Dar the Outcast) (2:44) 
 The Beastmaster (Seq. 23 – Pyramid Battle, Part I (Alternate) (2:49) 
 The Beastmaster (Seq. 24 – Pyramid Battle, Part II (Alternate) (2:18) 
 The Beastmaster (Seq. 25 – Pyramid Battle, Part III (Alternate) (3:57) 
 The Beastmaster (Seq. 26 – Preparations) (1:48) 
 The Beastmaster (Seq. 27 – The Horde Attacks/The Moat/Dar vs. Jun Leader) (4:48) 
 The Beastmaster (Seq. 28 – The Tide Turns) (1:30) 
 The Beastmaster (Seq. 29 – A New King) (3:24) 
 The Beastmaster (Seq. 30 – Finale) (2:05) 
 The Battle on the Pyramid (Film version) (6:42)

Release
The Beastmaster was planned to open December 25, 1982, but that July United Artists acquired domestic distribution rights and rescheduled the film for a summer release. It was rescheduled to August and had a promotional sneak peek of the film at the Comic Book and Science Fiction Convention in Los Angeles.

The Beastmaster premièred in theatres on August 19, 1982. It was released in 16 cities in the United States on 165 screens and opened in eight more cities and 66 screens in its second week. The film opened in fifth place on its opening week. After six weeks, it had a total box office revenue of $3,561,475.

It subsequently received significant local TV and cable airplay, notably on HBO, TBS, and TNT. The film was shown so often on HBO that comedian Dennis Miller joked that HBO stood for "Hey, Beastmaster's On". It was also shown so often on TBS that it popularly gained a similar joke that TBS stood for "The Beastmaster Station". In 1993, a programming director for TNT claimed that it was second only to Gone with the Wind as the most popular movie to air on the network and attributed its success to its "mythological appeal—it's more serious than the Conan movies", while a programming director for Cinemax stated that "you can come into any part of it and not feel you've missed much".

The filmmakers arranged for star Tanya Roberts to appear in Playboy to help promote the film, but that issue didn't end up coming out until after the film had already been released.

Reception
The Beastmaster grossed roughly $14 million on its initial theatrical release. Josh Milrad was nominated for a Young Artist Award for "Best Young Supporting Actor in a Motion Picture" for his co-starring role as Tal in the film.

According to Variety, the film opened to mixed reviews. Gene Siskel of the Chicago Tribune gave it two stars out of four and wrote that it "isn't bad as much as it is overlong. After one of the film's major bad guys has been bumped off, the film inexplicably goes on for another 20 minutes. In this sort of brainless adventure film, one climax is enough". Vincent Canby of The New York Times thought the film was "neither better nor worse than 'Conan the Barbarian and "looks both big and cheap". Variety wrote: "When The Beastmaster begins, it is very hard to tell what it is all about. An hour later, it is very hard to care what it is all about. Another hour later, it is very hard to remember what it was all about". Kevin Thomas of the Los Angeles Times called it "a veritable comic book adventure come alive" that "succeeds on its own merits". Tom Milne of The Monthly Film Bulletin found the film "marginally livelier" than Conan the Barbarian but criticized the "very basic acting, the appalling post-synching, the sets which resort to disconcertingly ramshackle models, and direction of supreme stodginesss which predictably uses helicopter shots to illustrate the eagle's spying missions (when all it sees as a rule is the hero prancing on the hilltops in self-conscious martial arts poses)".

The film holds a score of 50% on Rotten Tomatoes based on 14 reviews, with an average rating of 5.31 out of 10.

Sequels and television series
The Beastmaster received a sequel in 1991, Beastmaster 2: Through the Portal of Time. The film was directed by the original film producer Sylvio Tabet. The made-for-television third film aired in 1996 on Universal Television's Action Pack and is titled Beastmaster III: The Eye of Braxus. Both sequels feature Marc Singer in the role of Dar. The films were followed by a syndicated television series in 1999. The television series changes the backstory of Dar, who is played by Daniel Goddard.

See also
 The Sword and the Sorcerer – a contemporaneous movie from the same genre

References

External links

1982 films
1980s fantasy adventure films
American fantasy adventure films
West German films
American sword and sorcery films
Films adapted into television shows
Films based on American novels
Films based on science fiction novels
American pregnancy films
Films directed by Don Coscarelli
Films scored by Lee Holdridge
Metro-Goldwyn-Mayer films
German fantasy adventure films
English-language German films
American films about revenge
Beastmaster films
1980s pregnancy films
1980s English-language films
1980s American films
1980s German films